Cappadonna Hits is a greatest hits album by rapper Cappadonna. It contains songs from his first two albums.

Track listing
"Super Model" (featuring: Ghostface Killah)
"Slang Editorial"
"Love Is the Message" (featuring: Raekwon)
"Oh-Donna" (featuring: Ghostface Killah)
"Run"
"We Know" (featuring: Jermaine Dupri, Da Brat)
"Black Boy"
"Bread of Life" (featuring: Killah Priest, Neonek)
"War Rats"
"Check for a Nigga"
"Dart Throwing" (featuring: Raekwon, Method Man)
"The Grits" (featuring: 8-Off)

References

2001 compilation albums
Cappadonna albums